The 2019 TCR Spa 500 was the first edition of the TCR Spa 500 endurance touring car race. It was promoted by the WSC, the group behind the TCR concept, and Creventic, who promotes the 24H Series.

The race was won by Red Camel-Jordans.nl with Pepe Oriola, Tom Coronel, Rik Breukers and Ivo Breukers, which completed 454 laps. In second place came DG Sport Compétition with Aurélien Comte, Julien Briché and Teddy Clairet, with third place going to the TOPCAR Sport with Bas Koeten Racing team of Mikel Azcona, Julien Apotheloz, Fabian Danz, Antti Buri and Kari-Pekka Laaksonen.

Teams and drivers

Results

Qualifying
Class pole positions in bold.

Race
The minimum number of laps for classification (60% of the overall winning car's race distance) was 273 laps. Class winners in bold.

Notes

References

External links
 

Spa 500
Spa 500